Ralph Oliver Prouton (1 March 1926 – 12 September 2018) was an English first-class cricketer.

Cricket
Between 1949 and 1954 Prouton played 52 first-class matches for Hampshire as a wicketkeeper/batsman, scoring 982 runs at an average of 14.44, taking 84 catches and making 13 stumpings. He made his first-class debut against Leicestershire at Southampton in 1949, making a duck in his only innings, taking two catches and making two stumpings in the two Leicestershire innings. Hampshire won the match by 100 runs. He made his top score of 90 against Leicestershire in a drawn match at Portsmouth in 1953. Following the retirement of incumbent wicketkeeper Neil McCorkell, Prouton played 26 matches in 1952, missing only 3 games. Thereafter he played 17 matches in 1953 but only 3 matches in 1954, as Leo Harrison established himself as the first choice wicketkeeper.

He also played in 9 matches for Hampshire 2nd XI between 1949 and 1952 and 3 matches for the Marylebone Cricket Club (MCC) during 1950 and 1951. He became a Minor Counties Cricket Championship umpire, adjudicating in 53 matches between 1957 and 1969 plus two further miscellaneous matches involving the army. His brother Geoffrey also had cricket trials for Hampshire, as did his nephew Thomas Prouton.

Football
Prouton was also signed as a footballer for Arsenal, but in 1952 moved to Swindon Town without having played a single first-team game for Arsenal. He played 13 league and 3 cup matches as wing-half for Swindon during 1952/53, but then left the club at the end of the season.

Subsequent career
Prouton became a teacher at Downside School.

References

External links
 
 Ralph Prouton at CricketArchive

1926 births
2018 deaths
Cricketers from Southampton
Hampshire cricketers
Swindon Town F.C. players
English cricketers
Association football midfielders
English footballers
Footballers from Southampton